Loose Change is a series of films about the September 11, 2001, attacks.

Loose change may refer to:

Music
 Loose Change (EP), an extended play of Ed Sheeran
 Loose Change, a 2006 album by The Gaskets
 "Loose Change", a 1998 song by Bruce Springsteen from Tracks
 "Loose Change", a 2003 song by Ja Rule
 "Loose Change", a 2014 song by Royal Blood from their self-titled album
 "Loose Change", a 2022 song by Brent Faiyaz from the album Wasteland

Other uses 
 Loose Change (book), a 1977 non-fiction book by Sara Davidson
 TSA Loose Change Act (2013 USA 113 H.R. 1095), a failed bill concerning money left at TSA checkpoints
 "Mr. Monopoly's Loose Change" / "Uncle Pennybags's Loose Change", a playing square in Monopoly Junior

See also
 Loose (disambiguation)
 Change (disambiguation)